An Australian federal budget is a document that sets out the estimated revenues and expenditures of the Australian Treasury in the following financial year, proposed conduct of Australian government operations in that period, and its fiscal policy for the forward years. Budgets are called by the year in which they are presented to Parliament and relate to a financial year that commences on the following 1 July and ends on 30 June of the following year, so that the  budget brought down in May  relates to the / financial year (1 July  – 30 June , FY).

Revenue estimates detailed in the budget are raised through the Australian taxation system, with government spending (including transfers to the states) representing a sizeable proportion of the overall economy. Besides presenting the government's expected revenues and expenditures, the federal budget is also a political statement of the government's intentions and priorities, and has profound macroeconomic implications.

Australia follows, to a great extent, the conventions of the Westminster system. For example, the prime minister must have the support of a majority in the House of Representatives, and must in any case be able to ensure the existence of no absolute majority against the government. In relation to the budget, that requires that if the House fails to pass the government's budget, even by one dollar, then the government must either resign so that a different government can be appointed or seek a parliamentary dissolution so that new general elections may be held in order to re-confirm or deny the government's mandate.

Process

The process of putting together the budget begins in November when the Central Budget Management System (CBMS) is updated with the latest estimates, and the senior ministers' review, where the Prime Minister, Treasurer, and Minister for Finance meet to establish the policy priorities and strategy for the coming financial year.

The outcome of the senior ministers' review determines how the different portfolios will prepare their budget submissions for cabinet. Agencies within each portfolio do not submit a request for new funding, because their potential savings within the agency are unfounded. After Finance has agreed to the costings, the submissions are circulated for coordination comments and lodged with the cabinet office by late February.

The Expenditure Review Committee (ERC), a committee of Cabinet, meets in March to consider all submissions. They decide which proposals will be funded and the level of funding each will receive. At the end of the ERC, the ad hoc revenue committee meets to make decisions on the revenue streams of the budget. A pre-budget review of the estimates is conducted after all decisions have been finalised to ensure that they are reflected in CBMS.

Budget documentation commences at the end of the ERC process. Agencies prepare two components: the portfolio budget statements and the mid-year economic and fiscal outlook.

The portfolio budget statements provide additional details and explanations of the budget and the statement of risks, which is included in Budget Paper No. 1.

The final budget is presented and tabled in Parliament by the Treasurer on budget night as part of the Second Reading of the Appropriation Bill (No. 1), which "appropriates money out of the Consolidated Revenue Fund for the ordinary annual services of the government".

Charter of Budget Honesty Act
The budget has to be presented within the framework that has been established by the Charter of Budget Honesty Act (1998).

The charter provides for:
 sound fiscal management of the Australian economy
 open dissemination about the status of public finances
 transparency in Australia's fiscal policy

Budget night
Between 1901 and 1993, the practice was for the budget to be brought down in August, on the first Tuesday night of the Spring session. 

Since 1994, the Treasurer has presented the budget on the second Tuesday in May, with the exceptions of 1996 (due to an election and a change of government in March, the budget was brought down in August), 2016 (it was held on the first Tuesday in May to allow the government to potentially call a double dissolution election following the presentation of the budget), 2019 (when an election called for 18 May caused the budget to be brought forward to 2 April), 2020 (when it was postponed to October due to the COVID-19 pandemic and 2022 (when an election called for May caused the budget to be brought forward to 29 March).

On budget day, but before the presentation of the budget, the Treasurer spends the day behind locked doors briefing media and interest groups on various aspects of the budget. This is known as the budget lock-up. Because of the market sensitive nature of some of the information which they are being provided, those invited to attend the briefings are not allowed access to the outside world until the budget has been presented in Parliament by the Treasurer, which normally commences at 7.30 pm.

In modern times, the budget has been broadcast live from Parliament House on the ABC and Sky News Australia. It is hosted on the ABC, without interruption from 7:30 pm to 8 pm, normally followed up with a report by a panel assessing the changes, benefits and flaws in the budget. Additional budget documents and materials are available on the government budget website for other interested parties.

A convention in Australian politics is that the Leader of the Opposition is given a "right of reply", which they deliver in Parliament two days after the government's budget speech, and which is also broadcast on television.

Budgetary policy developments

In comparison with similar economies, Australia's government spending is relatively low. For the twenty-year period from 1960 to 1980, the growth in spending roughly matched percentages in the much higher populated nations of Japan and the United States.

In the first half of the 1980s, spending increased by approximately 3% of gross domestic product and the tax rate surpassed that of Ronald Reagan's administration. However, government accountability was a highly contentious issue in the late 1970s, and John Howard maintains that under Fraser "spending went up... at about two per cent per year in real terms... Reagan [didn't do] better than that".

As the debate played out, the free-market politicians turned to attacking the political parties which were in power in the Australian states, and public sector medium enterprises came to be seen as inefficient. The economic term "current account deficit" was in vogue.

Riding on strong economic growth in the latter part of the 1980s, the Hawke Government brought forward an agenda for public sector reform that had been pioneered in the US. Declaring a number of debt reduction strategies ranging from tariff rate reductions to privatisation and competitive tendering, Australia's public sector significantly declined in the period of his tenure.

Spending in the 1990s saw significant shifts in social policy expenditure as part of a broader scheme of "low inflation targeting". Although outlays for services to industry increased, the budget outcome remained the same throughout the early 1990s recession. The Howard Government reduced expenditure by 1.3% of gross domestic product in its first two years, making large cutbacks to outlays for the hospital system and education. Overall the government continued to run down public debt and promote asset trading in the private sector.

See also 

 Australian Government Future Fund
 Australian government debt
 Commonwealth Grants Commission
 Fiscal imbalance in Australia
 Taxation in Australia

International:
 Government budget by country

Footnotes

References

External links
 Australia Federal Budget
 Charter of Budget Honesty Act (1998) at ComLaw

 
Government finances in Australia